Es Migjorn Gran is a small municipality in southern Menorca in the Spanish Balearic Islands. Formerly incorporated into the municipality of Es Mercadal, it is currently the island's newest and second-smallest municipal district. The main inland village of Es Migjorn Gran is surrounded by small pine-clad hills, and the coast is home to a small variety of tourist resorts and unspoilt beaches, Santo Tomas being the principal resort. There are many 'calas' or coves that are encompassed by pine-covered cliffs along the coast, where there are small sandy beaches only accessible by foot or by sea, which mean they are very rarely busy.

Es Migjorn Gran borders the municipality of Ciutadella (Ciudadella), Ferreries (Ferrerías), Es Mercadal (Mercadal) and Alaior (Alayor). Nearby are the resorts of Son Bou and Cala Galdana, the latter being the most-photographed bay in Europe. It was the hometown of Joan Riudavets, the oldest Spanish citizen on record.

History

The village of Es Migjorn Gran was founded as a small rural settlement in the eighteenth century and was incorporated into the district of Es Mercadal. In 1989, the area surrounding Es Migjorn Gran became an independent municipality, the newest and one of the smallest on the islands. Historically, Es Migjorn was a quiet village, home to narrow streets and a small variety of tapas bars. A small church San Cristobal, in the centre of town is the only major landmark.

Comparable to other regions of Menorca, Es Migjorn district is home to several prehistoric sites, notably abandoned settlements known as talaiots and caves in the hillsides.

Geography

Situated in the central south of Menorca, Es Migjorn Gran is one of the principal towns not situated on the main Maó-Ciutadella road.

Demographics

The municipality is very sparsely populated, with only one major resort and an inland town.

References

Municipalities in Menorca
Populated places in Menorca